Sperchon is a genus of mites belonging to the family Sperchontidae.

The species of this genus are found in Eurasia and Northern America.

Species:
 Sperchon avimontis Habeeb, 1957
 Sperchon ayyildizi

References

Trombidiformes
Trombidiformes genera